Meymand is a village in Dursun Khvajeh Rural District, in the Central District of Nir County, Ardabil Province, Iran. At the 2006 census, its population was 319, in 74 families.

References 

Tageo

Towns and villages in Nir County